Kutuleh-ye Aziz Khan (also Romanized as Kūtūleh-ye ‘Azīz Khān; also known as Kūtūleh and Kotūleh) is a village in Gol Gol Rural District, in the Central District of Kuhdasht County, Lorestan Province, Iran. At the 2006 census, its population was 169, in 34 families.

References 

Towns and villages in Kuhdasht County